Decoradrillia pulchella  is a species of sea snail, a marine gastropod mollusk in the family Drilliidae.

Description
The size of an adult shell varies between 14 mm and 25 mm. The pink shell has a chestnut band below the periphery, and a chestnut line, interrupted by the tubercles.

Distribution
This species occurs in the demersal zone of the Caribbean Sea (Jamaica, Colombia) and the Gulf of Mexico; in the Atlantic Ocean from Florida to Northern Brazil at depths between 0 m and 100 m.

References

 Tucker, J.K. 2004 Catalog of recent and fossil turrids (Mollusca: Gastropoda). Zootaxa 682: 1–1295. 
 Rosenberg, G., F. Moretzsohn, and E. F. García. 2009. Gastropoda (Mollusca) of the Gulf of Mexico, Pp. 579–699 in Felder, D.L. and D.K. Camp (eds.), Gulf of Mexico–Origins, Waters, and Biota. Biodiversity. Texas A&M Press, College Station, Texas
  Fallon P.J. (2016). Taxonomic review of tropical western Atlantic shallow water Drilliidae (Mollusca: Gastropoda: Conoidea) including descriptions of 100 new species. Zootaxa. 4090(1): 1–363

External links
 Gastropods.com: Fenimorea halidorema; retrieved: 24 October 2011
 

pulchella
Gastropods described in 1845